The Movement for a People's Party (MPP), also known simply as the People's Party, is a progressive political organization in the United States aimed at "forming a major new political party free of corporate money and influence".

Nick Brana formed the party after the 2016 presidential election as "Draft Bernie for a People's Party." Bernie Sanders declined to be the People's Party's figurehead, instead again seeking the presidential nomination in the 2020 Democratic Party presidential primaries.

History 

The organization was founded by Nick Brana, who previously worked with the Bernie Sanders 2016 presidential campaign as the National Political Outreach Coordinator. In 2017, Brana formed the group out of the "Draft Bernie for a People's Party", which failed to gain Sanders's support. The group gathered 50,000 signatures on a petition to present to Sanders and held its first mass gathering, the "Convergence Conference", in Washington, D.C. "The ultimate goal is to replace the Democratic Party, it's not merely to create another party," said Brana in 2017.

In 2018, the Movement for a People's Party posted its mission statement to pressure the major parties into adopting a progressive agenda. 

The organization held a virtual People's Convention on August 30, 2020. The convention was covered live and viewed by 400,000 people on various platforms.

Speakers at the convention included former Democratic Party 2020 presidential election candidate Marianne Williamson, former Harvard University professor and philosopher Cornel West, Sanders 2020 co-chair Nina Turner, former Minnesota governor Jesse Ventura, comedian/political commentator/satirist Jimmy Dore, journalist Chris Hedges and podcaster Ryan Knight.

The convention's ultimate goal was intended to be a vote on forming a new political party to represent the interests of the people. Supporters viewing the convention online approved the measure with a 99% majority.

While many of the speakers at the convention expressed frustration and distaste for the candidates for the 2020 presidential election, the organization did not contest the 2020 election and instead plans to form a party in 2021, run in the midterms in 2022 and possibly run a presidential candidate in 2024.

On December 1, 2020, the first People's Party state organization was registered in Maine. According to Michael Sylvester, the party will mainly focus on pushing congressional officials into supporting a floor vote for Medicare for All. 

In September 2021, the People's Party gained ballot access in Florida, the first state where it has done so.

Ballot access
Virginia 
Florida
Missouri

See also
 Forward Party, a political action committee (PAC) that seeks to form a new political party in the United States.

References

External links 

 
 

2017 establishments in the United States
Aftermath of the 2016 United States presidential election
Political parties established in 2017
Left-wing parties in the United States
Progressive parties in the United States
Socialist parties in the United States